Rock and Roll Popular 1 Magazine is a Spanish music magazine based in Barcelona, operating since 1973.

History 
Popular 1 was founded in Barcelona in 1973 by artist José Luis Martín Frías (Martin J. Louis) and his wife Bertha M. Yebra. In those years of the Francoist State culture, specially Rock music, was something restricted by the State. 
The magazine was a musical reference in the mid seventies, covering international  tours of bands like Pink Floyd, Lou Reed or Queen and the success of Spanish singers like Nino Bravo.

Spanish Pop artists like  Alaska and Loquillo worked in the magazine during the 80´s. Other contributors include Spanish journalists Jordi Sierra i Fabra, Julían Ruíz, Mariano Muniesa  had collaborate in different periods of Popular 1 in the last four decades.

During the 1990s the magazine covered the Grunge Era and specially the career of L.A bands like  Guns N' Roses, Mötley Crüe and Jane's Addiction. Also Kiss, since their reunion in 1996, had appear in the front cover of the magazine regularly.

Today
Rock and Roll Popular 1 is still published on a monthly basis. In 2013 they celebrate their forty Anniversary becoming one of the oldest music publications in Europe.

Magazine founder José Luis Martín Frías is known for his friendship with artist  Salvador Dalí  and his career as a rock photographer. Today he still exhibits in US,
Russia and Spain.

See also
 List of magazines in Spain

References

External links
 Official Site

1973 establishments in Spain
Magazines established in 1973
Magazines published in Barcelona
Monthly magazines published in Spain
Music magazines
Spanish-language magazines